The 2007–08 Wisconsin Badgers women's ice hockey team was the Badgers' 8th season. Led by head coach Mark Johnson, the Badgers went 20-5-3 in the WCHA.

Regular season

Schedule

Awards and honors
Erika Lawler, Badger Award (known as Most Inspirational Player award)
Jesse Vetter, WCHA Goaltending Champion (Lowest league goals-against
average)

All-WCHA
Mallory Deluce, F, All-WCHA Rookie Team
Meghan Duggan, F, First Team
Hilary Knight, F, All-WCHA Rookie Team
Erika Lawler, F, Second Team
Jessie Vetter, G, First Team
Jinelle Zaugg, F, Third Team

WCHA All-Tournament team
 Jinelle Zaugg, Forward

WCHA Player of the Week
 Alycia Matthews: Week ofOct. 29, 2007
 Jessie Vetter, Week of January 21, 2008
 Jessie Vetter, Week of January 28, 2008

WCHA Rookie of the Week
Mallory Deluce, Week of Oct.15, 2007
Mallory Deluce, Week of Oct. 22, 2007
Mallory Deluce, Week of Feb. 18, 2008
Hilary Knight, Week of Jan. 7, 2008
Hilary Knight, Week of Feb. 4, 2008

References

Wisconsin
Wisconsin Badgers women's ice hockey seasons
NCAA women's ice hockey Frozen Four seasons
Wiscon
Wiscon